Timur Beg, also known as Timur Sijan (division general), was a Uighur rebel military leader in Xinjiang in 1933. He was involved in the 1933 Battle of Kashgar and participated before in Turpan Rebellion (1932). He associated with the Turkic nationalist Young Kashgar Party and appointed himself as "Timur Shah". He and other Uighurs like the Bughra brothers wanted to secede from China. In August 1933  his troops were attacked by the Chinese Muslim 36th Division of the National Revolutionary Army under General Ma Zhancang. Timur was shot and killed in Kashgar.

References

External links 
 The Soviets in Xinjiang (1911–1949) by Mark Dickens

Uyghurs
East Turkestan independence activists
1933 deaths
1886 births
People executed by the Republic of China by decapitation
Executed people from Xinjiang
Young Kashgar Party politicians
Executed Chinese people
Republic of China politicians from Xinjiang
People from Aksu Prefecture